Mitchell County (standard abbreviation: MC) is a county located in the U.S. state of Kansas. As of the 2020 census, the county population was 5,796. The largest city and county seat is Beloit.

History

Early history

For many millennia, the Great Plains of North America was inhabited by nomadic Native Americans.  From the 16th century to 18th century, the Kingdom of France claimed ownership of large parts of North America.  In 1762, after the French and Indian War, France secretly ceded New France to Spain, per the Treaty of Fontainebleau.

19th century
In 1802, Spain returned most of the land to France, but keeping title to about 7,500 square miles.  In 1803, most of the land for modern day Kansas was acquired by the United States from France as part of the 828,000 square mile Louisiana Purchase for 2.83 cents per acre.

In 1854, the Kansas Territory was organized, then in 1861 Kansas became the 34th U.S. state.  In 1867, Mitchell County was established.

Geography

Adjacent counties
 Jewell County (north)
 Cloud County (east)
 Ottawa County (southeast)
 Lincoln County (south)
 Osborne County (west)

Demographics

As of the census of 2010, there were 6,373 people, 2,790 households, and 1,725 families residing in the county.  The population density was 8.8 people per square mile (3.4/km2).  There were 3,296 housing units at an average density of 4.6 per square mile (1.7/km2).  The racial makeup of the county was 97.97% White, 0.20% Black or African American, 0.37% Native American, 0.29% Asian, 0.07% Pacific Islander, 0.26% from other races, and 0.80% from two or more races.  1.14% of the population were Hispanic or Latino of any race.

There were 2,790 households, out of which 24.30% had children under the age of 18 living with them, 52.29% were married couples living together, 6.23% had a female householder with no husband present, and 38.17% were non-families. 33.08% of all households were made up of individuals, and 15.12% had someone living alone who was 65 years of age or older. The average household size was 2.20 and the average family size was 2.77.

In the county, the population was spread out, with 21.44% under the age of 18, 8.00% from 18 to 24, 19.83% from 25 to 44, 29.67% from 45 to 64, and 21.04% who were 65 years of age or older.  The median age was 45.6 years. For every 100 females there were 102.0 males.  For every 100 females age 18 and over, there were 102.2 males.

The median income for a household in the county was $44,247, and the median income for a family was $54,502. Males had a median income of $30,044 versus $20,094 for females. The per capita income for the county was $23,350. About 4.90% of families and 8.26% of the population were below the poverty line, including 12.04% of those under age 18 and 12.33% of those age 65 or over.

Government

Presidential elections
Prior to 1940, Mitchell County was a swing county, backing the national winner in every presidential election from 1900 to 1936. Since 1940, it has become a Republican stronghold, with only George H. W. Bush in 1992 failing to win a majority in the county due to Ross Perot's strong showing in Kansas.

Laws
Following amendment to the Kansas Constitution in 1986, the county remained a prohibition, or "dry", county until 1996, when voters approved the sale of alcoholic liquor by the individual drink with a 30% food sales requirement.

Education

Colleges
 North Central Kansas Technical College in Beloit

Unified school districts
 Waconda USD 272
 Beloit USD 273

Private schools
 St. John's Catholic High School
 Tipton Catholic High School

Communities

Cities
 Beloit (county seat) 
 Cawker City
 Glen Elder
 Hunter
 Tipton
 Scottsville
 Simpson (partly in Cloud County)

Unincorporated communities
 Asherville (a census-designated place)
 Solomon Rapids

Townships
Mitchell County is divided into twenty townships.  The city of Beloit is considered governmentally independent and is excluded from the census figures for the townships.  In the following table, the population center is the largest city (or cities) included in that township's population total, if it is of a significant size.

See also
 National Register of Historic Places listings in Mitchell County, Kansas

References

Further reading

 Standard Atlas of Mitchell County, Kansas; Geo. A. Ogle & Co; 73 pages; 1917.
 Standard Atlas of Mitchell County, Kansas; Geo. A. Ogle & Co; 56 pages; 1902.
 Atlas of Mitchell County, Kansas; Gillen & Davy; 45 pages; 1884.

External links

County
 
 Mitchell County - Directory of Public Officials
Maps
 Mitchell County Maps: Current, Historic, KDOT
 Kansas Highway Maps: Current, Historic, KDOT
 Kansas Railroad Maps: Current, 1996, 1915, KDOT and Kansas Historical Society

 
Kansas counties
1867 establishments in Kansas
Populated places established in 1867